Barnabás Tamás (born September 26, 1952) is a Hungarian politician, member of the National Assembly (MP) for Kazincbarcika (Borsod-Abaúj-Zemplén County Constituency VII) from 2010 to 2014. He was a member of the Defence and Internal Security Committee from May 14, 2010 to May 5, 2014 and Committee on Youth, Social, Family, and Housing Affairs from February 14, 2011 to May 5, 2014.

Tamás has been the Mayor of Putnok since 1994.

References

1952 births
Living people
Fidesz politicians
Members of the National Assembly of Hungary (2010–2014)
Mayors of places in Hungary
People from Putnok